The Statement may refer to:

 The Statement (novel), a 1995 novel by Brian Moore
 The Statement (film), a 2003 film by Norman Jewison, based on Brian Moore's novel

See also 
 Statement (disambiguation)